Domini Crosfield, Lady Crosfield (1884 – 15 January 1963), was a British Liberal Party politician and tennis player.

Background
Born Domini Elliadi in Lancashire, she was the daughter of Elie M. Elliadi (1843–1928), a Greek merchant from Smyrnia, and Marie Homer (1863–1924). In 1907 she married Arthur Crosfield, Liberal MP for Warrington, 1906–10. When her husband was created a baronet in 1915 she became Lady Crosfield.

Career
During World War One, Lady Crosfield was Honorary Adviser on Exhibitions and Art to the Greek Department of Information. From 1915-19 she was Commandant of two VAD hospices. She  was actively involved in the running of the North Islington Infant Welfare Centre and School for Mothers. In 1919 she became President of the centre, a position she would hold until 1959. She was Founder and Chairman of Pediki Steghi (Day Nurseries) and of Music for Children in Greece. She was a Member of Council, for the Imperial Society of Teachers of Dancing. She was a Member of the Grants Committee of the National Playing Fields Association. She was a Member of the Executive of the Children’s Playground Committee. She was a Member of the Executive of National Association of Maternity and Child Welfare. She was a Member of the Executive and Chairman of the Standing Committee of the Anglo-Hellenic League. She was Vice-President and Director of the London Philharmonic Society. She was Vice-President of the National Playing Fields Association and a member of the Grants and Children’s Playground Sub-Committee.

Political career
At a parliamentary General Election she contested, as a Liberal party candidate Islington North in 1929;

She did not stand for parliament again. In 1938, she was awarded the Golden Cross of the Order of George I (Greece). She was made a Commander of the Order of the Phoenix (Greece) and the Diploma of Commander of Order of Welfare (Greece).

She was a championship tennis player, and at her home in Witanhurst she hosted her own charity tennis competition immediately after the Wimbledon fortnight, with many of the championship players staying on in London for the event. For the 1906 Intercalated Games, Domini Elliadis entered the Women's singles but did not start at the event.

References

1963 deaths
1884 births
Liberal Party (UK) parliamentary candidates
Wives of baronets
Tennis players at the 1906 Intercalated Games
English female tennis players
British people of Greek descent